This article listed the confirmed squads lists for 2007 Men's EuroHockey Nations Championship  between August 19 to August 26, 2007.

Pool A

Head coach: Markus Weise

Head coach: Jason Lee

Head coach: Adam Commens

Head coach: Gino Schilders

Pool B

Head coach: Maurits Hendriks

Head coach: Roelant Oltmans

Head coach: Bertrand Reynaud

Head coach: David Passmore

References

EuroHockey Nations Championship squads
Squads